Dirivultidae is a family of crustaceans belonging to the order Siphonostomatoida.

Genera

Genera:
 Aphotopontius Humes, 1987
 Benthoxynus Humes, 1984
 Ceuthoecetes Humes & Dojiri, 1980

References

Siphonostomatoida